Messaoud Mohammed Zeghdane (born January 25, 1981) is an amateur Algerian Greco-Roman wrestler, who played for the men's middleweight category. Zeghdane represented Algeria at the 2008 Summer Olympics in Beijing, where he competed for the men's 74 kg class. He received a bye for the preliminary round of sixteen match, before losing out to Germany's Konstantin Schneider, who was able to score four points each in two straight periods, leaving Zeghdane with a single point.

References

External links
Profile – International Wrestling Database
NBC 2008 Olympics profile

Algerian male sport wrestlers
1981 births
Living people
Olympic wrestlers of Algeria
Wrestlers at the 2008 Summer Olympics
21st-century Algerian people
Place of birth missing (living people)
20th-century Algerian people